The Purple Spirit Singers is a group of male traditional Indigenous singers, led by Brandon Barberstock of the Tyendinaga Mohawk Territory, who sing in various drum styles (see Pow Wow Singers, Hand Drum Singers, Round Dance Singers, etc.).  This group originally formed when a collective of Indigenous students studying at Western University (London, On.) decided that they wanted to create a group to share songs, teachings, and positive energy within the group and throughout the community.  The name translates from English into Anishinaabemowin as Zhoomin-Innande Manitou Negamowaad - meaning Purple Spirit Singers.

Origin 
While attending a round dance event at Chippewas of the Thames First Nation in the winter of early-2015, Brandon Barberstock (drum keeper, lead singer) expressed the desire to have an Indigenous men's drum on Western University Campus with fellow students studying at the university.  Erik Mandawe and Jason George shared this desire, and together, they formed the group.  Since coming together, the group has performed at numerous pow wows and community events, for televised events, and for community workshops in cultural teachings.  The group has gone on to include more members from the university, as well as within various communities.  This was the vision and intent of the group, as it was personally important for each founding member that they be able to share traditional teachings on culture and identity amongst members, as well as the community at large.

Purpose and vision 
The primary role of drum groups in Indigenous communities is to allow for the proliferation of cultural teachings to be passed down onto the next generation.  The big drum represents the heartbeat of
mother earth, and the connection we have with the land.  The songs that are sung around the drum have a variety of purpose, including but not limited to ceremonial (i.e. Sundance), celebratory, or in reference to a specific cultural dance (i.e. grass dance, fancy dance, traditional men's/women's, etc.)  For Purple Spirit, the purpose for this drum group is to allow for community members an opportunity to learn more about Indigenous culture, while creating a positive, healthy environment for those who sit around the big drum.

Videos 
Examples of some of their songs/performances:
 Sundance Song at Munsee-Delaware Nation Pow Wow (2015)
 AIM Song at Indigenous Graduation Ceremony (2015) - Western University
 Honour Song at Munsee-Delaware Nation Pow Wow (2015)

Events 

Some events/venues that Purple Spirit has performed at include:
 Munsee-Delaware Nation Pow Wow
 Oneida Nation of the Thames Long-term Care Seniors Home
 Various birthday celebrations in the community
 CTV Television Network Green Room at the Covent Garden Market - London, On.
 Western University Orientation Week (2015)
 Missing and Murdered Indigenous Women (MMIW) rally (2015) - London, On.
 Kettle Point Pow Wow (2015)
 Stoney Point Memorial Pow Wow (2015)
 Western University Pow Wow (2015)
 University of Waterloo Pow Wow (2015)
 Museum of Ontario Archaeology Pow Wow (2015) - London, On.
 Reception for Winona LaDuke - part of the Indigenous Health & Well-being Initiative summer school

References 

Mohawk culture
First Nations musical groups